The Adventures of Sherlock Holmes and Dr. Watson is a series of Soviet television films portraying Arthur Conan Doyle's fictional English detective, starting in 1979. They were directed by Igor Maslennikov.

Overview 
Between 1979 and 1986, Soviet television produced a series of five films at the Lenfilm movie studio, split into eleven episodes, starring Vasily Livanov as Sherlock Holmes and Vitaly Solomin as Dr. Watson. Later, a cinematic adaptation was made based on the 1986 episodes. This film was called The Twentieth Century Approaches.

Episodes 
The series ran as follows:
 1979 Sherlock Holmes and Dr. Watson
 1st episode: "Acquaintance" (based on "The Adventure of the Speckled Band").
 2nd episode: "Bloody Inscription" (based on A Study in Scarlet).
 1980 The Adventures of Sherlock Holmes and Dr. Watson
 1st episode: "The King of Blackmail" (based on "The Adventure of Charles Augustus Milverton").
 2nd episode: "Deadly Fight" (based on "The Final Problem").
 3rd episode: "The Tiger Hunt" (based on "The Adventure of the Empty House").
 1981 The Adventures of Sherlock Holmes and Dr. Watson: The Hound of the Baskervilles. Two episodes based on The Hound of the Baskervilles.
 1983 The Adventures of Sherlock Holmes and Dr. Watson: The Treasures of Agra. Two episodes based on The Sign of the Four and "A Scandal in Bohemia".
 1986 The Adventures of Sherlock Holmes and Dr. Watson: The Twentieth Century Approaches. Two episodes based on "The Adventure of the Engineer's Thumb", "The Adventure of the Second Stain", "The Adventure of the Bruce-Partington Plans" and "His Last Bow".

Production 

Unlike some of their Western counterparts, the films are very close to the literary source. Some of the departures include Holmes' easy-going and humorous demeanor, as well as comic relief provided by some of the characters (most notably that of Sir Henry Baskerville and his butler Barrymore in The Hound of the Baskervilles episode).

The series' soundtrack was composed by Vladimir Dashkevich; the introductory piece has become one of the most recognizable pieces of cinematic music in the former Soviet Union. The tune intentionally resembles an hourly musical logo played on the shortwave BBC Russian Service (the Prince of Denmark's March), and Maslennikov later confirmed that he wanted a similar tune which could be identified with the spirit of the British Empire.

A street in old Riga doubles as Baker Street. The same street was used for exterior locations for several Soviet features set in the West.

Regular cast 
 Vasily Livanov as Sherlock Holmes
 Vitaly Solomin as Dr. Watson
 Rina Zelyonaya as Mrs. Hudson
 Borislav Brondukov as Inspector Lestrade
 Igor Dmitriev as Tobias Gregson
 Boris Klyuyev as Mycroft Holmes
 Viktor Yevgrafov as Professor Moriarty

Reception 
The films were positively received by the Soviet audience, noting the actors' masterful portrayal of the main characters and the production's attention to detail. The series became a cultural phenomenon and to this day remain a legendary masterpiece of Soviet television. In the West, the reception of the series was warm, especially in the United Kingdom. British critics have pointed out that the creators of the series have treated the original source with due care and respect, and have successfully transferred the atmosphere of Sir Arthur Conan Doyle's works.
In 2006, Vasily Livanov became an Honorary MBE (Member of the Order of the British Empire) for his portrayal of Sherlock Holmes. Livanov's wax statue is displayed in the Sherlock Holmes Museum in London.
In 2007, a statue to Sherlock Holmes and Dr. Watson, as played by Livanov and Solomin, was erected in Moscow near the British embassy.
In 2007, to commemorate the 120th anniversary of the first Sherlock Holmes novel, a New Zealand private coin manufacturer New Zealand Mint produced a limited edition memorial coin series in silver, with the likenesses of Livanov and Solomin, as well as other Soviet actors from the Sherlock Holmes series.

See also
 Sherlock Holmes (2013) – Russian TV series
 Sherlock in Russia – 2020 Russian TV series

References

External links

A page dedicated to the series

Sherlock Holmes television series
Lenfilm films
Soviet television miniseries
Soviet crime television series
Sherlock Holmes film series
Film series introduced in 1979